Nils Bengt Folke Ekerot (8 February 1920 – 26 November 1971) was a Swedish actor best known for portraying Death in The Seventh Seal (1957) directed by Ingmar Bergman. In 1956, he directed the world premiere of Long Day's Journey into Night, the masterpiece of US playwright Eugene O'Neill.

Early life
Ekerot was born in Stockholm.

Career
He had several roles in Swedish films, but in Ingmar Bergman's The Seventh Seal (1957) he portrayed Death as a white-faced man in a black cloak. The decision to perform the role in this way was a joint decision between the actor and director. Bergman wrote in his autobiography Images: My Life in Film that the two men "agreed that Death should wear a clown mask, a white clown’s mask. A fusion of a clown mask and a skull."

He also appeared in Bergman's 1958 film, The Magician (also released as Ansiktet (lit. Swedish: "The Face") as Johan Spegel, an ailing vaudevillian.

Death
A man with a self-destructive personality, health issues from smoking and excessive drinking affected Ekerot's later career resulting in him losing potential roles. He died from lung cancer in 1971.

Partial filmography

 They Staked Their Lives (1940) - Freedom Fighter
 Hanna in Society (1940) - Fred Hummerberg
 The Talk of the Town (1941) - Sven Törring
 Snapphanar (1941) - Lille-Jonas
 Lågor i dunklet (1942) - Åke Kronström, Student (uncredited)
 We House Slaves (1942) - Linus Tallhagen
 Nothing Is Forgotten (1942) - Student at art school (uncredited)
 Night in Port (1943) - John
 När ungdomen vaknar (1943) - Lennart
 Sonja (1943) - Bengt
 Gentleman with a Briefcase (1943) - Stig
 Tre söner gick till flyget (1945) - Erik
 The Rose of Tistelön (1945) - Anton, hennes bror
 Fram för lilla Märta eller På livets ödesvägar (1945) - Radio Speaker (voice, uncredited)
 Crime and Punishment (1945) - Studenten
 13 stolar (1945) - Clerk (uncredited)
 Brita in the Merchant's House (1946) - 'Paniken'
 Interlude (1946) - Tjuven
 Dynamite (1947) - Allan Axelson
 Marianne (1953) - Companion (uncredited)
 Hamlet (1955, TV Movie) - Hamlet, prins av Danmark
 Stage Entrance (1956) - Johan Eriksson
 The Seventh Seal (1957) - Death
 The Jazz Boy (1958) - Erik Jonsson
 The Magician (1958) - Johan Spegel
 On a Bench in a Park (1960) - Sam Persson
 Myten (1966) - Policeman / Social Worker / Guard / Doctor
 Here Is Your Life (1966) - Byberg
 Life's Just Great (1967) - The Neighbour
 Ola & Julia (1967) - Max
 Who Saw Him Die? (1968) - Eriksson
 Korridoren (1968) - Birger Olsson (final film role)

References

External links

1920 births
1971 deaths
Deaths from lung cancer
Male actors from Stockholm
20th-century Swedish male actors
Swedish film directors
Deaths from cancer in Sweden